Nissel is a surname. Notable people with the surname include:

 Angela  Nissel (born 1978), American writer
 Muriel Nissel (1921–2010), British statistician and civil servant
 Siegmund Nissel (1922-2008), Austrian-born British violinist
 J. Thomas Nissel (born 1931), American lawyer and judge